The 1995–96 season was Sheffield Wednesday F.C.'s 129th season. They competed in the twenty-team Premier League, the top tier of English football, finishing fifteenth.

Season summary
David Pleat's first season as Sheffield Wednesday manager was the club's worst in the top flight since winning promotion in 1991. The eagerly-anticipated signing of Belgian forward Marc Degryse turned out to be a major disappointment, though David Hirst provided a fair supply of goals on his return to fitness after a two-year injury struggle.

The Owls struggled all season long, and finished 15th in the final table. This was another dismal showing for a club who were chasing honours just two or three seasons earlier, and Pleat knew that something had to change, and set out to reward the club's board for keeping faith in him for a second season.

Marc Degryse, Chris Waddle, Chris Woods and Klas Ingesson all left in the close season, and all the talk at Hillsborough was the acquisition of young striker Andy Booth from Huddersfield Town for £2.5 million. Many fans saw him as the answer to the problems which had plagued the Owls during the last seasons, and gave them hope of a new challenge for honours.

Final league table

Results summary

Results by round

Results
Sheffield Wednesday's score comes first

Legend

FA Premier League

FA Cup

League Cup

UEFA Intertoto Cup

Players

First-team squad
Squad at end of season

Left club during season

Reserve squad

Transfers

In

Out

Transfers in:  £6,175,000
Transfers out:  £8,010,000
Total spending:  £1,835,000

Notes

References

 
 
 

Sheffield Wednesday F.C. seasons
Sheffield Wednesday